Dunama mexicana is a moth in the  family Notodontidae. It is found in Mexico.

The length of the forewings is 11–15 mm for males and 12–17 mm for females. Adult males are grayish brown, but the transverse median band of the forewing is paler. The spots basad of the band and in the reniform spot are dark brown. Adult females are considerably darker brown. The ventral surface of the wings is essentially immaculate in both sexes except for some small yellowish-brown and oblique marks on the apical half of the costal margin of the forewing.

The larvae feed on Chamaedorea species.

References

Moths described in 1976
Notodontidae